The Gianh River is a river in the Quảng Bình Province of Vietnam's North Central Coast (Bắc Trung Bộ).

It was the border between ruling families during the partition of Vietnam following the Trịnh–Nguyễn War of the 17th century, serving to effectively divide the country between northern and southern regions. The 17th parallel used as the border between North Vietnam and South Vietnam from 1954 to 1975 was located just to the south, at the Bến Hải River in Quảng Trị Province.

2009 boat accident

On 25 January 2009 a boat accident took place on the river, resulting in the deaths of 42 people and the disappearance of five others.

External links
Rivers in Quảng Bình Province, from official website of Quảng Bình government

Rivers of Quảng Bình province
Rivers of Vietnam

Borders of Vietnam